The Beyeler Foundation or Fondation Beyeler with its museum in Riehen, near Basel (Switzerland), owns and oversees the art collection of Hildy and Ernst Beyeler, which features modern and traditional art. The Beyeler Foundation museum includes a space for special exhibitions staged to complement the permanent collection. In 2006, approximately 340,000 persons visited the museum. The number of visitors in 2016 was 332,000. The Beyeler Foundation is the most visited museum of art in all of Switzerland. The museum is properly funded, and it receives annual grants from the cantons of Basel City and Basel County and the commune of Riehen. Major partners of the Foundation are Bayer AG, Novartis and Swiss bank UBS.

History 
Art dealers Ernst Beyeler (16 July 1921 – 25 February 2010) and Hilda Kunz (1922 - 18 July 2008), known as Hildy, created the Beyeler Foundation in 1982 and commissioned Renzo Piano to design a museum to house their private collection. The collection was first publicly exhibited in its entirety at the Centro de Arte Reina Sofía in Madrid in 1989, and was subsequently shown at Neue Nationalgalerie in Berlin in 1993 and the Art Gallery of New South Wales in Sydney in 1997. In September 1994 the groundbreaking of the museum took place. The inauguration was scheduled for 1996, but postponed until 1997 due to delays in the construction. In October 1997, the Beyeler Foundation made its collection accessible to the public.

Collection and exhibitions 

The Beyeler Foundation opened its doors on 18 October 1997, presenting 140 works of modern classics, including 23 Picassos. The overall collection of 200 works of classic modernism reflect the views of Hildy and Ernst Beyeler on 20th-century art and highlight features typical of the period from Claude Monet, Paul Cézanne and Vincent van Gogh to Pablo Picasso, Andy Warhol, Roy Lichtenstein and Francis Bacon (artist). The paintings appear alongside some 25 objects of tribal art from Africa, Oceania and Alaska. A third of the exhibition space is reserved for special exhibitions staged to complement the permanent collection.

The culmination of Beyeler's career came in 2007 when all the works that passed through his hands were reunited at the museum for a grand exhibition that included van Gogh's 1889 Portrait of Postman Roulin, Lichtenstein's Plus and Minus III and a huge expressive drip painting by Jackson Pollock. The collection is expanding, particularly in terms of works made after 1950 (recent acquisitions include pieces by Louise Bourgeois and Wolfgang Tillmans). In 2013, French art collector Micheline Renard donated several artworks to the museum, including by Jean Dubuffet, Jean-Michel Basquiat, Sam Francis, and Sigmar Polke; the trove was first exhibited at the museum in 2014.

The garden surrounding the museum also periodically serves as a venue for special exhibitions. In a work called "Wrapped Trees", Christo and Jeanne-Claude veiled 178 trees in the park around the Beyeler Foundation and in the adjacent Berower Park between 13 November and 14 December 1998.

Selected collection highlights

Architecture 

According to a design of the Italian architect Renzo Piano the construction of the museum began in September 1994 in the Berower Park in Riehen. The museum was meant to be embedded in the English landscape garden in the park and according to Beyeler, not only be a museum but also a small power plant in which its visitors were to regain strength. The building features a glazed façade largely looking out onto the corn fields and vines covering the Tüllinger Hills. The two perimeter walls of the original garden site inspired the idea of the museum’s layout. A red wall built with porphyry from Patagonia, South America replaced to the original in place before. Resting on top of the solid foundation walls, the lightweight glass roof, white enamelled on the reverse, admits northern light but screens off light from the east and the west. Along the northern and the southern sides the roof projects far beyond the walls, shading the glass façades from the sun.

Situated vis-à-vis the museum building, the late-Baroque Villa Berower houses the museum's administration department and a restaurant.

Partners and sponsors

Public Sponsors 
 Swiss Confederation
 Municipality of Riehen 
 Canton of Basel-City

Major Partners 
 Bayer
 Novartis
 UBS

Partners 
 accurART
 Basler Kantonalbank
 Fondation BNP Paribas
 Rolls-Royce Motor Cars
ISS Facility Services
 J. Safra Sarasin

Further reading
Hollerstein, Roman. Renzo Piano - Fondation Beyeler. A Home for Art: Foundation Beyeler - A Home for Art. Birkhäuser Verlag, 1998. .
Boehm, Gottfried. Fondation Beyeler. Prestel, 2001. .
Beyeler, Ernst; Büttner Philippe. Fondation Beyeler. Collection. Hatje Cantz, 2008. .

See also 
Museums in Basel

References

External links
Beyeler Foundation website
"Wrapped Trees" in the Beyeler Foundation
Basel-Karlsruhe: Rainer Usselmann on 'Face to Face to Cyberspace' at Fondation Beyeler
 Set of photos
Virtual tour of the Beyeler Foundation provided by Google Arts & Culture

Art museums and galleries in Switzerland
Modern art museums
Museums in Basel
Former private collections
Renzo Piano buildings
Riehen
Art museums established in 1997
1997 establishments in Switzerland
Arts foundations based in Switzerland